Nalapat Narayana Menon (7 October 1887 – 31 October 1954) was a Malayalam language author from Kerala state, South India. His oeuvre consists of poems, plays and translations. His best known works include Paavangal, a translation of Victor Hugo's Les Misérables, and the elegy Kannuneerthulli.

Early life
He was born in Punnayurkulam, Ponnani taluk in South Malabar on 7 October 1887. He obtained English education from Kunnamkulam, Trichur and  Calicut. While he was 18, he met poet Vallathol and became his chief companion.

Literary career
Vallathol's influence is obvious in his early poems. He was also influenced by Robert G. Ingersoll and was an atheist for most of his youth. Later he developed strong interest in Indian philosophy and religion and was influenced by the ideas of Dayananda Saraswati and Swami Vivekananda. Most of his early prose works were on subjects related to Indian philosophy. His most famous poem Kannuneerthulli (Tear Drop) was an elegy written after the death of his wife. Paavangal, a translation of Victor Hugo's Les Misérables, was a milestone in the history of Malayalam literature and it set off a social reformation of sorts in Kerala. Despite being a translation, it gifted Malayalam a new prose style. Literary critic M. Leelavathy notes: "The translation was an extraordinary phenomenon as it prepared the ground for the Communist movement to take roots in Kerala. With its philosophy of human equality, the heart-wrenching tale of the oppressed left a profound impact in our society. For E.M.S. Namboodiripad, this was Nalapatan's best work. Its influence was both sociological and philological."

Personal life
Nalapat was the uncle of poet Balamani Amma and the grand uncle of renowned writer Kamala Surayya (Madhavikutty or Kamala Das)  and Dr. Suvarna Nalapt, writer and music therapy researcher. He is fondly referred to as Valiyammavan by Madhavikutty in her books such as Neermathalam Pootha Kaalam.  Lokantharangalil was an elegy by Balamani Amma on the death of Nalapat Narayana Menon.

Works

Poetry
 Kannuneerthulli
 Chakravalam
 Daivagathi Ottanthullal
 Nalappattinte Padyakrithikal
 Pulakankuram
 Pukayila Mahatmyam Kilippattu
 Lokam
 Sulochana

Play
 Sapatnyam
 Veshu Ammayude Vishari

Others
 Arshajnanam
 Gurusannidhi
 Dayananda Saraswati
 Valmiki Prashnam
 Vallathol Narayana Menon
 Nimitha Sastram
 Rathi Samrajyam
 Paavangal (Translation)
 Pourasthyadeepam (Translation)

References

1887 births
1954 deaths
Malayali people
Indian male dramatists and playwrights
Malayalam-language dramatists and playwrights
20th-century Indian translators
Malayalam-language writers
Malayalam poets
20th-century Indian dramatists and playwrights
People from Thrissur district
Poets from Kerala
Indian male poets
20th-century Indian poets
Dramatists and playwrights from Kerala
20th-century Indian male writers